Walter Edwin Hansgen (October 28, 1919 – April 7, 1966) was an American racecar driver. His motorsport career began as a road racing driver, he made his Grand Prix debut at 41 and he died aged 46, several days after crashing during testing for the 1966 24 Hours of Le Mans.

Racing career

A four-time SCCA Road Racing Champ, Hansgen participated in two Formula One Grands Prix, debuting on October 8, 1961, at Watkins Glen, New York. He scored a total of two championship points. In 1964 he raced the MG Liquid Suspension Special, an Offenhauser-powered car, for Kjell Qvale, at the Indianapolis 500. He finished 13th in that race. He raced there again in 1965, in the MG-Huffaker-Offenhauser, when he finished 14th.

In addition to Formula One, Walt Hansgen was a dominant road racer from the early 1950s and 1960s, winning numerous races at VIR, the famed course at Bridgehampton, and Watkins Glen through to his death at Le Mans in France in 1966.

He drove for Briggs Cunningham and John Mecom. Hansgen won the Formula Junior race at the inaugural United States Grand Prix meeting at Sebring, Florida, on December 12, 1959, driving a Stanguellini. Hansgen won the Monterey Grand Prix, at Laguna Seca Raceway, on October 17, 1965, driving John Mecom's Lola T70-Ford. He participated in several races of the 24 Hours of Daytona and Le Mans as well as the 12 Hours of Sebring endurance races. He also was notable for introducing Mark Donohue to professional road racing.

Hansgen was killed when he crashed a 7-liter Holman & Moody Ford GT 40 Mk2 sports car while driving in the rain during the Le Mans tests on April 3, 1966. "A Ford spokesman said Hansgen's car appeared to have been aquaplaning on the wet track leaving no way for the driver to control it." Ford crew members later said that Hansgen had continued to push hard in the damp weather, although he had been warned by team manager Carroll Smith to take it easy.<ref>Shelby GT 40, Friedman, Dave, 1995, pg. 96</ref>  In Mark Donohue's book, The Unfair Advantage, it is said that Hansgen tried to drive onto an escape road, only to find out too late that a barrier had been built across it for spectator safety.

Racing record

SCCA National Championships

24 Hours of Le Mans results

Complete Formula One World Championship results
(key) 

Indianapolis 500

NASCAR
(key) (Bold – Pole position awarded by qualifying time. Italics – Pole position earned by points standings or practice time. * – Most laps led.)

Grand National Series

Books
 Michael Argetsinger, Walt Hansgen, His Life and the History of Post-War American Road Racing, David Bull Publishing, 2006, 

References

External links

Road Racing Drivers Club - see members bio list - biography and photograph (includes biographies of all ever invited to join Road Racing Drivers Club'', living and deceased)

1919 births
1966 deaths
24 Hours of Le Mans drivers
American Formula One drivers
Team Lotus Formula One drivers
Indianapolis 500 drivers
People from Westfield, New Jersey
Racing drivers from New Jersey
Racing drivers who died while racing
Sportspeople from Union County, New Jersey
Sport deaths in France
World Sportscar Championship drivers
SCCA National Championship Runoffs winners
NASCAR drivers